Geoffrey Gadbois (born November 4, 1994) is an American bobsledder.

He participated at the IBSF World Championships 2019, winning a medal.

References

External links

1994 births
Living people
American male bobsledders